Vladimir Viktorovich Moskalyov (born 3 September 1986) is a Russian football referee.

Career 
Moskalyov played for the youth teams of his native city but was forced to stop at age 15 due to injury. He then began to referee.

In 2014, he was the youngest referee in the Russian Premier League. The first match in the Premier League which he refereed was on 30 August 2014 between Mordovia and Torpedo, in which he showed 9 yellow cards, one of which was the second for that player.

In the entire 2014–15 season, he refereed 14 games, which showed 52 yellow cards, of which 4 are on the second, 2 red cards, and 5 appointed penalties.

In 2015–16 he worked 22 games.

He became a FIFA referee in 2019.

References

External links 
 
 
 Владимир Викторович Москалёв at championat.com 
 Профиль арбитра at soccer.ru 
 Владимир Левитин: Москалев – очень талантливый судья, он всё сделал правильно at sovsport.ru 
 Сергей Хусаинов: Арбитр Москалёв не в ладах с правилами игры в футбол at afonin.ss-net.ru 

1986 births
Living people
Sportspeople from Voronezh
Russian football referees